The Single Electricity Market encompassing the entire island of Ireland does not, and has never, produced any electricity from nuclear power stations. The production of electricity for the Irish national grid (Eirgrid), by nuclear fission, is prohibited in the Republic of Ireland by the Electricity Regulation Act, 1999 (Section 18). The enforcement of this law is only possible within the borders of Ireland, and it does not prohibit consumption. Since 2001 in Northern Ireland and 2012 in the Republic, the grid has become increasingly interconnected with the neighbouring electric grid of Britain, and therefore Ireland is now partly powered by overseas nuclear fission stations.

A ‘Eurobarometer’ survey in 2007 indicated that 27 percent of the citizens of Ireland were in favour of an “increased use” of nuclear energy.

As of 2014, a Generation IV nuclear station was envisaged in competition with a biomass burning facility to succeed Ireland's single largest source of greenhouse gases, the coal burning Moneypoint power station, when it retires, c. 2025.

In 2015 a National Energy Forum was founded to decide upon generation mixes to be deployed in the Republic of Ireland, out to 2030. This forum has yet to be convened (Oct 2016).

Electricity security

In 2014 Ireland sourced about 70% of its electricity from fossil gas. The primary source ("95%") of this gas to Ireland is via the Moffat-Isle of Man-Gormanstown/"Dublin" connection and to a lesser extent, the Scotland-Northern Ireland pipeline (SNIP), both of these pipes are, in of themselves, connected to the wider British pipe-network and the European continent Dutch-British network. This great network of pipes is supplied with North Sea Gas and as that source is drying up, a greater dependence is expected on the frequently disrupted European gas network for which Russia being a primary provider.

Carnsore Point

A nuclear power plant was proposed in 1968, and resulted in the creation of the Nuclear Energy Board. It was to be built during the 1970s at Carnsore Point in County Wexford by the Electricity Supply Board. The plan envisioned four reactors to be built at the site, but was dropped in 1981 after strong opposition from anti-nuclear lobby groups throughout the 1970s, particularly in 1978 with concerts and rallies being held at Carnsore Point attended by popular musician Christy Moore. The intended generating capacity of the planned station was therefore required to be sourced from other energy sources, and such, the construction of the coal burning Moneypoint power station began in 1979.

Fission electricity enters Ireland

Following the completion of the HVDC Moyle cable in 2001, connecting Northern Ireland and Scotland, and the larger capacity 500 MW East-West Interconnector in 2012, a submarine cable that connects County Dublin with Wales, Ireland has been supported with electricity from the generation of the Welsh Wylfa fission-electric power station and fission electricity in Britain as a whole. The Wylfa power stations is however  shuttered, the last reactor shut down in 2015. Ireland was a net  exporter of electricity in 2016 and 2017.

Revived interest
 

In April 2006, a government-commissioned report by Forfás pointed to the need for Ireland to reconsider nuclear power in order "to secure its long-run energy security". A relatively small-scale, Generation IV nuclear station was envisaged. In 2007, Ireland's Electricity Supply Board made it known that it would consider a joint venture with a major European Union energy company to build nuclear capacity.

A 2012 International Energy Agency (IEA) report said that Ireland is highly dependent on imported oil and natural/fossil gas. While the push to develop renewable energies is commendable, it will result in an increased reliance on fossil gas, as gas-fired power plants will be required to provide flexibility in electricity supply when wind power is unavailable. About 60% of Ireland's electricity already comes from gas-fired generation, which adds to energy security concerns, particularly as 93% of its gas supplies come from a single transit point in Scotland.

In 2013, the Environmental Protection Agency in Ireland warned that Ireland is not on track to meet its 2020 pollution reductions of greenhouse gases.

As there is a need to replace the coal burning 900 MW Moneypoint power station, situated in the South West of Ireland, a station which will approach its design life in 2025   and until then it will remain as Ireland's primary emitter of greenhouse gases. A dependable baseload power source with a high capacity factor will be required to keep the grid stable in its absence, a role that is now being filled by Moneypoint station, this role will thus need to be filled by a low carbon power station to mitigate climate change.

As of 2014, a Generation IV nuclear station was envisaged in competition with a biomass burning facility to succeed Moneypoint.

In 2015 a National Energy Forum was envisaged to decide on generation mixes to be deployed in Ireland 
out to 2030, as of July 2016 this forum has not been convened.

Celtic interconnector
In 2016 proposals for a $1 billion Irish-French subsea cable, with a capacity for 700 MW, close to the 900 MW output of Moneypoint, were discussed between both countries. With over 70% of French electricity generated from its fleet of fission-electric reactors, if connected, Ireland would further receive electricity from overseas nuclear energy suppliers, with the commencement of construction suggested for 2021, the Celtic Interconnector is expected to be completed by 2025. It would then become Ireland's only connection to an EU member state, following the withdrawal of the UK, in Brexit.

Nuclear fusion
As with the other members of the European Atomic Energy Community (Euratom), Ireland funds nuclear fusion energy research, including the International Thermonuclear Experimental Reactor, now known simply as the ITER project, with the Irish contribution being managed by the National Centre for Plasma Science & Technology at Dublin City University.

Donegal uranium prospecting

In 2007, the Green party which were the political architects behind the 1999 prohibition in the Republic of Ireland of the generation of fission-electricity, further prohibited the granting of exploration contracts to 2 unnamed mineral prospecting companies, which were requesting to explore the west of county Donegal. The then energy minister, the Green party's Eamon Ryan, signaled he was denying the exploration licenses as he is "against" nuclear energy. Ryan has also  stated that "It would be hypocritical to permit the extraction of uranium for use in nuclear reactors in other countries, while the nuclear generation of electricity is not allowed in Ireland". The suggested mining method of In-situ liquid extraction of underground uranium, was deemed the most likely had the prospecting developed into a mining license.

Ireland is a member state signatory to the Nuclear Exporters Committee, which requires indigenous exploration and processing companies conduct all uranium-ore extraction and handling. The international committee monitors the exporting of process knowledge and techniques and therefore requires each member state to indigenously develop the processing techniques and manufacture all the equipment that relate to natural uranium ore, within its own borders.

See also
Radiological Protection Institute of Ireland
List of power station sites in Ireland
ISLES project - EU funded Irish-Scottish feasibility project to assess collaboration on Wind and Wave energy projects.
Spirit of Ireland - a large pumped-storage construction concept, that may be required to supplement Irish wind energy intermittency.
 Fallout (2006 TV series)
 Adi Roche

References

External links
IRISH NUCLEAR PROJECT - COLOUR, a contemporary documentary on Carnsore point
The origins of Ireland’s anti-nuclear stance is charted in Going Nuclear: Ireland, Britain and the Campaign to Close Sellafield by Veronica McDermott, 2007 Irish Academic Press
Uranium exploration licenses denied. Minister Ryan Calls Halt to Uranium Exploration in Ireland 2007
Ryan Calls for Debate on Nuclear Power, 2008
 Live and interactive map of Ireland and EU wide electricity generation, cost and emission intensity per unit of electricity generated

Energy in Ireland
Ireland
Nuclear power in Europe by country